Akashdeep Singh Batth (born 30 January 1992) is an Indian Punjabi film director, producer, author and screenwriter. Batth made his directional debut with Myself Ghaint (2014). In 2011, Batth became a published author with his English fiction Anhad -The Man on Mission. Akashdeep was 18 years old when he first published his English fiction and 22 years old when he released his first Punjabi feature film, Myself Ghaint, thus becoming the youngest film director in the Punjabi film industry.

Filmography

Author

References

Film directors from Punjab, India
1992 births
Indian male novelists
Indian male screenwriters
Living people